Chiara Raso (born 26 October 1981) is an Italian ski mountaineer.

Raso was born in Aosta. She started ski mountaineering in 2000 and competed first in the Tour de Breuil race in the same year. She has been member of the national team since 2002.

Selected results 
 2002:
 2nd, World Championship single race, "espoirs" class
 2nd, Transacavallo (together with Maria Luisa Riva)
 4th, World Championship team race (together with Gloriana Pellissier, "seniors" ranking)
 2003:
 1st, Trofeo Mezzalama (together with Arianna Follis and Cristina Favre-Moretti)
 4th, European Championship team race (together with Maria Luisa Riva)
 2006:
 1st, World Championship relay race (together with Francesca Martinelli, Roberta Pedranzini and Gloriana Pellissier)
 6th, World Championship vertical race
 8th, World Championship team race (together with Paola Martinale)

External links 
 Chiara Raso at skimountaineering.org

References 

1981 births
Living people
Italian female ski mountaineers
World ski mountaineering champions
People from Aosta
Sportspeople from Aosta Valley